The Movement for the Renewal of Social Zionism (Tenoa'a LeHithadshut Tzionut Hevratit) was a short-lived minor political party in Israel.

Background
Headed by Mordechai Ben-Porat, the party contested the 1977 Knesset elections, but missed out on winning a seat by 0.2%.

Ben-Porat subsequently joined Telem and was elected to the Knesset on its list in 1981.

The party failed to cross the electoral threshold in the 1984 elections and subsequently disappeared. Ben-Porat moved on, joining Likud in 1988.

References

External links
Movement for the Renewal of Social Zionism Knesset website

Defunct political parties in Israel
Zionist political parties in Israel
1970s establishments in Israel
Political parties established in the 1970s
Political parties disestablished in the 1980s
1980s disestablishments in Israel